Adnan Shah, well known as Adnan Shah Tipu or simply Tipu is a Pakistani actor known for his comic and villainary roles.

Career
Adnan Shah started his career in 1999 as a television actor and gained popularity through a sitcom titled "Sub Set Hai" created by Azfar Ali, which was aired on Indus Vision in 2001. He has appeared in many television serials in Pakistan such as Makan (2006). Tipu has also acted in 2011 sitcom series Kis Din Mera Viyah Howay Ga. He made his debut as a film actor in 2003 film Khamosh Pani. In 2008, he appeared in drama film Ramchand Pakistani, followed by his Bollywood debut film Kajraare (2010), directed by Pooja Bhatt. Tipu starred in Josh: Independence Through Unity and grabbed the nomination in ARY Film Award for Best Actor. He played a villainary role in Dukhtar (2014) and also starred in the Indian film Welcome to Karachi (2015). In an interview to The Express Tribune, he said regarding the film: "I am impressed by the work, not by the name of an actor. It is true both (Jackky and Arshad) are good actors but even if I end up appearing in the same frame with legendary actors like Marlon Brando, Al Pacino or Dilip Kumar I will not let myself become overawed by their presence but will instead try to do what I do best and give my best performance,”. In 2016, he appeared in Ashir Azeem's Maalik which was banned in Pakistan after few days of release.

Awards and nominations

|-
! scope="row" | 2006
| Adnan Shah
| 1st Indus Drama Awards for Best Supporting Actor
|
|-
! scope="row" | 2014
| Adnan Shah
| ARY Film Award for Best Actor
|
|-
! scope="row" |2019
|Tipu Shah
|7th Hum Awards for Best Supporting Actor
|
|}

Filmography

Television

References

External links

Living people
21st-century Pakistani male actors
People from Faisalabad
People from Karachi
University of the Punjab alumni
Pakistani male film actors
Pakistani male television actors
Punjabi people
Year of birth missing (living people)